Darsigny is a surname. Notable people with the surname include:

 Shad Darsigny (born 2003), Canadian weightlifter
 Tali Darsigny (born 1998), Canadian weightlifter
 Yvan Darsigny (born 1966), Canadian weightlifter